Central European Exchange Program for University Studies (CEEPUS)  is the short form for Central European Exchange Program for University Studies and is a multilateral University exchange program in the extended Danube region based on an international Agreement. There are 15+ members states who joint the current CEEPUS III agreement at the moment, each member state has a National CEEPUS Office. 

1. Objectives and Tasks 

The main activity of CEEPUS are networks of eligible universities of the CEEPUS member states operating joint programs. Within these networks CEEPUS covers mobility grants for students and teachers of those eligible universities. Since 1995 approximate 75.000 mobility applications have been awarded in the framework of our program. Current member countries: Albania, Austria, Bosnia and Herzegovina, Bulgaria, Croatia, the Czech Republic, Hungary, North Macedonia, Moldova, Montenegro, Poland, Romania, Serbia, the Slovak Republic and Slovenia. Prishtina/Kosovo is also participating.

2. History

As is so often the case in Austria, the first fundamental decisions were made at a Heuriger, more precisely, at the Heuriger on the occasion of the first Erasmus Day in 1992. What excited the minds: 1989 had been wonderful, but meanwhile the traditional means of academic cooperation had become got lost. So how do we continue to work together with the states of the former Eastern Bloc? And you didn't need new forms, because the "Eastern Aid" of the first years after the fall of the Wall had done its duty and had become obsolete. And speaking of Erasmus: Austria was just starting to take part, but who knew exactly when the partners in Eastern Europe were finally allowed to take part? It couldn't cost a lot either, and the administrative effort should be as low as possible.
This gave rise to the bold idea of developing a Central and Eastern European, regional university exchange program. Then everything happened very quickly: the decision was officially made at a regional ministerial conference in Graz in November 1992, and the first high-level conference of officials took place in Vienna in February. The name "CEEPUS" - Central European Exchange Program for University Studies "was born. The six founding states emerged from the group of invited participants: in addition to Austria, Bulgaria, Poland, Slovakia, Slovenia and Hungary. The provisional CEEPUS General Secretariat started its work and coordinated the establishment of the CEEPUS I Treaty. Then the big moment: the signing on December 8th, 1993 in Budapest.

3. Organizational Structure 

CEEPUS is based on lean management. The highest-ranking decision making CEEPUS body is the Joint Committee of Ministers that meets once a year and takes all strategic decisions.

CEEPUS is based on lean management. The highest-ranking decision making CEEPUS body is the Joint Committee of Ministers that meets once a year and takes all strategic decisions.

 Joint Committee of Ministers
The Joint Committee of Ministers is the highest CEEPUS body. It meets every other year and takes all basic decisions, such as accepting new member states by unanimous invitation, deciding on further program development and taking any other major decision. And of course, the Joint Committee of Ministers is in charge of the CEEPUS budget and the CEEPUS internal currency, which is “1 scholarship month”, defined as a full scholarship according to the local standard of living. Each year all countries pledge the number of incoming scholarship months they will make available for the next academic year. The Joint Committee of Ministers is presided by one of its members, elected as CEEPUS Chair. The current CEEPUS Chair is Poland.

 Senior Officials´ Meeting
The Senior Officials´ Meeting convenes every year and deals with all technical decisions and current issues vital for the wellbeing of our program. Senior Officials are officials in charge of CEEPUS and with decision making power.

 CCO
The Central CEEPUS Office (CCO) in Vienna is responsible for the overall coordination of the program.

 NCO
Each country has a National CEEPUS Office (NCO) in charge of the national implementation of the Program. If you are interested in establishing a new university network, your National CEEPUS Office is the first contact point for information regarding the program and your guest country.
With CEEPUS, there is no direct transfer of funds. Each country pays its INCOMING students and teachers and has to pledge at least 100 scholarship months per academic year. The CEEPUS Agreement also specifies that these grants be comprehensive grants linked to the local cost of living.

4. Exchange CEEPUS covers mobility grants for students and teachers of those eligible universities.

 Duration of stays

Students: scholarships for regular semester activities shall be awarded for a minimum of 3 months and a maximum of 10 months.
Short term students: Shorter stays shall only be permitted for students working on
their theses or dissertations.
Short Term Excursions and Summer Schools which may be shorter than a month and may also be attended by undergraduates.
Teacher: if you are a teacher, please always choose ONLY THIS category, no matter for how long you want to stay

 Grant Rates

The individual monthly grant rate is dependent from your host country and may vary. See the national CEEPUS Office of your target country for current rates 
In some CEEPUS countries scholars will get extra outgoing reimbursement for their stay. Ask the National Office of your home country.

 Deadlines

June 15th mobility applications for the following winter term
October 31st: mobility application for the following summer term 
July 1st and November 30th: for Freemover-applications where applicable5. Networks We combine mobility with research and focusing on knowledge transfer in central Europe.
The main activity of CEEPUS are networks of eligible universities of the CEEPUS member states operating joint programs. Within these networks CEEPUS covers mobility grants for students and teachers of those eligible universities. Since 1995 approximate 75.000 mobility applications have been awarded in the framework of our program.6. What to sayStoyan Yaytsarov, SofiaIn conclusion I can say that my staying in Vienna was very useful for developing part of my diploma thesis. I become well acquainted with new methods and techniques in Hydro power plant constructions and Hydraulic Engineering. I met many people with the same interest as mine. I think that this period in Vienna will contribute to my future progress.Prof. Bojan Lalic, University of Novi SadWith CEEPUS it is more flexible and less bureaucratic than organising teaching at foreign universities in another way.Jovan Tatar, Montenegro'''''

I believe that my stay at TU Wien has contributed a lot in becoming more familiar with the lab environmental and testing techniques used in structural engineering.

External links  
 http://www.ceepus.info

Literature   

CEEPUS III Agreement
 
Rules of Procedure

Work Programme

International organisations based in Vienna
Universities and colleges in Europe